Cat Girl is a 1957 British-American horror film, produced by Herbert Smith and Lou Rusoff, directed by Alfred Shaughnessy, that stars Barbara Shelley, Robert Ayres, and Kay Callard. It was an unofficial remake of Val Lewton's Cat People (1942). AIP released Cat Girl on a double bill with their 1957 film The Amazing Colossal Man.

This was the first of two cat-related films starring Barbara Shelley, the other being The Shadow of the Cat (1961).

Plot
Leonora Johnson (Barbara Shelley) is a woman who returns to her ancestral home and is told she will inherit money, but also that there is a family curse: being possessed by the spirit of a leopard in spite of her disbelieving psychiatrist Dr. Brian Marlowe (Robert Ayres). After she wishes her husband dead, he is found clawed to death in a park by an animal. An escaped leopard appears to be the culprit, but Leonara is convinced she is transforming into a were-cat. When the leopard is struck and killed by a car, Leonora strangely dies simultaneously.

Cast

 Barbara Shelley as Leonora Johnson 
 Robert Ayres as Dr. Brian Marlowe 
 Kay Callard as Dorothy Marlowe 
 Ernest Milton as Edmund Brandt 
 Lilly Kann as Anna 
 Jack May as Richard Johnson 
 Patricia Webster as Cathy 
 John Lee as Allan 
 Edward Harvey as Doorman
 Martin Boddey as Cafferty 
 John Watson as Roberts 
 Selma Vaz Dias as Nurse

Production
The film was the first Anglo-U.S. co-production from American International Pictures. They put up $25,000 of the budget and a script by their regular writer Lou Rusoff in exchange for Western Hemisphere rights.

The script was originally entitled Wolf Girl. British director Shaughnessy thought the script about a were-cat was silly, so he rewrote the script to make it more of a psychological thriller wherein the lead character becomes convinced that she is transforming into a monster, but it's all really just in her mind. When the AIP executives watched the film, they were furious. Sam Arkoff wanted to know "Where is the Cat Monster?", so they hired special effects artist Paul Blaisdell to create a furry cat mask and claws (in less than 3 days) to splice into the film's finale for its U.S. release. 

Unfortunately, the cameraman shot most of this extra footage slightly out of focus, making it look really shoddy in Paul Blaisdell's opinion. Blaisdell also was disappointed at how little footage of his cat mask actually wound up in the finished film (the shots comprised only a matter of seconds). Blaisdell took the mask and claws home with him afterwards, and used them to make some home movies with his friend Bob Burns at Blaisdell's Topanga Canyon home.

References

External links
 
 Cat Girl at Turner Classic Movies
 
 
 Complete movie at AMCTV (certain territories only)
 Review of film at Cinemafantastiqueonline.com

1957 films
American supernatural horror films
British horror films
American International Pictures films
Films produced by Herbert Smith (producer)
Remakes of American films
Horror film remakes
1950s English-language films
1950s American films
1950s British films